{{Infobox clergy
| honorific_prefix = The Reverend
| name        = Sydney Sebastian Salins
| image       =
| bgcolour    = 
| imagesize   =
| caption     =
| pseudonym   =
| birthname   =
| birth_date  =
| birth_place = Karnataka, India
| occupation  = Theologian
| nationality = Indian
| ordained    =
| writings    = The Institutions on Balmatta, Mangalore<ref>Sydney S. Salins, The Institutions on Balmatta, Mangalore in Albrecht Frenz, Stefan Frenz (Edited), Zukunft im Gedenken (Future in Remembrance), Norderstedt 2007, pp.120-125. Cited in Judith Becker, Conversio im Wandel: Basler Missionare zwischen Europa und Südindien und die Ausbilding einer Kontaktreligiositat, 1834-1860, Vandenhoeck and Ruprecht, Gottingen, 2015, p.703.</ref>
| congregations = Church of South India Karnataka Southern Diocese
| offices_held =
| parents =Elizabeth (mother); W. A. Salins (father)
| footnotes   = 
}}

Sydney S. Salins is a New Testament Scholar who teaches at the Karnataka Theological College, Mangalore, a Seminary established in 1965 and affiliated to the nation's first University, the Senate of Serampore College (University).

Salins was a participant at the original exploratory committee on dialogue in 1997 conducted by the World Council of Churches

Studies
Salins had his ministerial formation at the United Theological College, Bangalore between 1970-1974 studying along with his companion John Sadananda for a Bachelor of Divinity (B. D.) awarded by the Senate of Serampore College (University) under the Registrarship of J. T. Krogh. Again from 1980-1982, Salins studied along with another companion Surya Prakash for a postgraduate course specialising in New Testament under J. G. F. Collison and K. James Carl and submitted a dissertation entitled A study of the use of the christological title, "Son of Man" in the writings up to 325 AD'' for which he was awarded a Master of Theology (M. Th.) degree by the University under the Registrarship of D. S. Satyaranjan.

Teaching ministry
Soon after his graduate studies at the Protestant Regional Seminary in Bangalore, Salins began teaching at the Karnataka Theological College, Mangalore from 1974 onwards and later availed study leave to equip himself with a postgraduate degree in New Testament in 1982. After a forty-year teaching ministry that began in 1974, Salins retired in early 2015 on attaining superannuation but continues to teach at the Seminary in Mangalore.

References

Christian clergy from Karnataka
Kannada people
20th-century Christian clergy
Indian Anglicans
Indian Christian theologians
Senate of Serampore College (University) alumni
Living people
Church of South India clergy
Academic staff of the Senate of Serampore College (University)
New Testament scholars
Indian biblical scholars
Anglican biblical scholars
Year of birth missing (living people)